German submarine U-767 was a Type VIIC U-boat built for Nazi Germany's Kriegsmarine for service during World War II.
She was laid down on 5 April 1941 by Kriegsmarinewerft Wilhelmshaven as yard number 150, launched on 10 July 1943 and commissioned on 11 September 1943 under Oberleutnant zur See Walter Dankleff.

Design
German Type VIIC submarines were preceded by the shorter Type VIIB submarines. U-767 had a displacement of  when at the surface and  while submerged. She had two shafts and two  propellers.

U-767 was fitted with five  torpedo tubes (four fitted at the bow and one at the stern), fourteen torpedoes, one  SK C/35 naval gun, (220 rounds), one  Flak M42 and two twin  C/30 anti-aircraft guns. The boat had a complement of between forty-four and sixty.

Service history
The boat's career began with training at 8th Flotilla on 11 September 1943, followed by active service on 1 May 1944 as part of the 1st Flotilla.

Wolfpacks
U-767 took part in no wolfpacks.

Fate
The boat's electrician was the sole survivor.

Summary of raiding history

References

Notes

Citations

Bibliography

External links

German Type VIIC submarines
1943 ships
U-boats commissioned in 1943
U-boats sunk in 1944
World War II submarines of Germany
Ships built in Wilhelmshaven
U-boats sunk by British warships
U-boats sunk by depth charges
World War II shipwrecks in the English Channel
Maritime incidents in June 1944